Livingston Memorial Church and Burial Ground is a historic Dutch Reformed church at CR 10 & Wire Road in Linlithgo, Columbia County, New York.  It was built in 1870 on the site of the original 1721 church and above the Livingston family burial crypt established in 1727.  It is on land provided by Robert Livingston the Elder (1654-1728) in his will.  It is a one-story, rectangular brick structure, 48 feet long and 24 feet wide. It features a square tower added to the building in 1890 and Gothic arched windows.  The burial ground contains 39 stones, with the earliest dating to 1772-1781; burials ceased in 1890.

It was listed on the National Register of Historic Places in 1985.

References

Churches on the National Register of Historic Places in New York (state)
Gothic Revival church buildings in New York (state)
Churches completed in 1870
Cemeteries on the National Register of Historic Places in New York (state)
Churches in Columbia County, New York
Cemeteries in Columbia County, New York
19th-century churches in the United States
National Register of Historic Places in Columbia County, New York